Mariska Kornet (born 4 March 1988) is a Dutch international cricketer who plays for the Dutch national side.

Kornet made her international debut for the Netherlands at the 2010 edition of the European Championship, with her matches at the tournament including a One Day International (ODI) match against Ireland. Later in the year, she was selected in the Dutch squad for the 2010 ICC Women's Challenge in South Africa, where she played in a further five ODIs as well as three Twenty20 International fixtures. Kornet's last ODIs before the Netherlands lost its ODI status came at the 2011 World Cup Qualifier in Bangladesh, where she played in four of her team's matches. Her final international appearances came at the 2013 World Twenty20 Qualifier. Kornet is the younger sister of Mandy Kornet, who has also played internationally for the Netherlands, with both sisters being born in Rotterdam.

In June 2018, she was named in the Netherlands' squad for the 2018 ICC Women's World Twenty20 Qualifier tournament.

References 

1988 births
Dutch women cricketers
Living people
Netherlands women One Day International cricketers
Netherlands women Twenty20 International cricketers
Sportspeople from Rotterdam
20th-century Dutch women
21st-century Dutch women